A republic is a system of government where people choose representatives through elections to make decisions in the public's interest. In contrast, a democracy might rely primarily on sortition (e.g. juries) to make decisions by a representative sample of the public while an autocracy concentrates power in very few hands.

, 159 of the world's 206 sovereign states use the word "republic" as part of their official names. Not all of these are republics in the sense of having elected governments, nor is the word "republic" used in the names of all states with elected governments.

The term developed its modern meaning in reference to the constitution of the ancient Roman Republic, lasting from the overthrow of the kings in 509 BC to the establishment of the Empire in 27 BCE. This constitution was characterized by a Senate composed of wealthy aristocrats wielding significant influence; several popular assemblies of all free citizens, possessing the power to elect magistrates and pass laws; and a series of magistracies with varying types of civil and political authority.

Most often a republic is a single sovereign state, but there are also subnational state entities that are referred to as republics, or that have governments that are described as republican in nature.

Etymology 

The term originates from the Latin translation of Greek word politeia. Cicero, among other Latin writers, translated politeia as res publica and it was in turn translated by Renaissance scholars as "republic" (or similar terms in various European languages).

The term politeia can be translated as form of government, polity, or regime and is therefore not always a word for a specific type of regime as the modern word republic is. One of Plato's major works on political science was titled Politeia and in English it is thus known as The Republic. However, apart from the title, in modern translations of The Republic, alternative translations of politeia are also used.

However, in Book III of his Politics, Aristotle was apparently the first classical writer to state that the term politeia can be used to refer more specifically to one type of politeia: "When the citizens at large govern for the public good, it is called by the name common to all governments (to koinon onoma pasōn tōn politeiōn), government (politeia)". Also amongst classical Latin, the term "republic" can be used in a general way to refer to any regime, or in a specific way to refer to governments which work for the public good.

In medieval Northern Italy, a number of city states had commune or signoria based governments. In the late Middle Ages, writers such as Giovanni Villani began writing about the nature of these states and the differences from other types of regime. They used terms such as libertas populi, a free people, to describe the states. The terminology changed in the 15th century as the renewed interest in the writings of Ancient Rome caused writers to prefer using classical terminology. To describe non-monarchical states, writers (most importantly, Leonardo Bruni) adopted the Latin phrase res publica.

While Bruni and Machiavelli used the term to describe the states of Northern Italy, which were not monarchies, the term res publica has a set of interrelated meanings in the original Latin. The term can quite literally be translated as "public matter". It was most often used by Roman writers to refer to the state and government, even during the period of the Roman Empire.

In subsequent centuries, the English word "commonwealth" came to be used as a translation of res publica, and its use in English was comparable to how the Romans used the term res publica. Notably, during The Protectorate of Oliver Cromwell the word commonwealth was the most common term to call the new monarchless state, but the word republic was also in common use. Likewise, in Polish the term was translated as rzeczpospolita, although the translation is now only used with respect to Poland.

Presently, the term "republic" commonly means a system of government which derives its power from the people rather than from another basis, such as heredity or divine right.

History 
While the philosophical terminology developed in classical Greece and Rome, as already noted by Aristotle there was already a long history of city states with a wide variety of constitutions, not only in Greece but also in the Middle East. After the classical period, during the Middle Ages, many free cities developed again, such as Venice.

Classical republics 

The modern type of "republic" itself is different from any type of state found in the classical world. Nevertheless, there are a number of states of the classical era that are today still called republics. This includes ancient Athens and the Roman Republic. While the structure and governance of these states was different from that of any modern republic, there is debate about the extent to which classical, medieval, and modern republics form a historical continuum. J. G. A. Pocock has argued that a distinct republican tradition stretches from the classical world to the present. Other scholars disagree. Paul Rahe, for instance, argues that the classical republics had a form of government with few links to those in any modern country.

The political philosophy of the classical republics has influenced republican thought throughout the subsequent centuries. Philosophers and politicians advocating republics, such as Machiavelli, Montesquieu, Adams, and Madison, relied heavily on classical Greek and Roman sources which described various types of regimes.

Aristotle's Politics discusses various forms of government. One form Aristotle named politeia, which consisted of a mixture of the other forms. He argued that this was one of the ideal forms of government. Polybius expanded on many of these ideas, again focusing on the idea of mixed government. The most important Roman work in this tradition is Cicero's De re publica.

Over time, the classical republics became empires or were conquered by empires. Most of the Greek republics were annexed to the Macedonian Empire of Alexander. The Roman Republic expanded dramatically conquering the other states of the Mediterranean that could be considered republics, such as Carthage. The Roman Republic itself then became the Roman Empire.

Other ancient republics 
The term "republic" is not commonly used to refer to pre-classical city-states, especially if outside Europe and the area which was under Graeco-Roman influence. However some early states outside Europe had governments that are sometimes today considered similar to republics.

In the ancient Near East, a number of cities of the Eastern Mediterranean achieved collective rule. Republic city-states flourished in Phoenicia along the Levantine coast starting from the 11th century BCE. In ancient Phoenicia, the concept of Shophet was very similar to a Roman consul. Under Persian rule (539–332 BCE), Phoenician city-states such as Tyre abolished the king system and adopted "a system of the suffetes (judges), who remained in power for short mandates of 6 years". Arwad has been cited as one of the earliest known examples of a republic, in which the people, rather than a monarch, are described as sovereign. The Israelite confederation of the era of the Judges
before the United Monarchy has also been considered a type of republic. The system of government of the Igbo people in what is now Nigeria has been described as "direct and participatory democracy."

Indian subcontinent

Early republican institutions come from the independent s means "tribe" and  means "assembly"which may have existed as early as the 6th century BCE and persisted in some areas until the 4th century CE in India. The evidence for this is scattered, however, and no pure historical source exists for that period. Diodorus, a Greek historian who wrote two centuries after the time of Alexander the Great's invasion of India (now Pakistan and northwest India) mentions, without offering any detail, that independent and democratic states existed in India. Modern scholars note the word democracy at the time of the 3rd century BCE and later suffered from degradation and could mean any autonomous state, no matter how oligarchic in nature.

Key characteristics of the  seem to include a monarch, usually known by the name raja, and a deliberative assembly. The assembly met regularly. It discussed all major state decisions. At least in some states, attendance was open to all free men. This body also had full financial, administrative, and judicial authority. Other officers, who rarely receive any mention, obeyed the decisions of the assembly. The monarch coordinated his activities with the assembly; in some states, he did so with a council of other nobles. The Licchavis had a primary governing body of 7,077 rajas, the heads of the most important families. On the other hand, the Shakyas, Koliyas, Mallakas, and Licchavis, during the period around Gautama Buddha, had the assembly open to all men, rich and poor. The most famous clan amongst the ruling confederate clans of the Vajji Mahajanapada were the Licchavis. The Magadha kingdom included republican communities such as the community of Rajakumara. Villages had their own assemblies under their local chiefs called Gramakas. Their administrations were divided into executive, judicial, and military functions.

Scholars differ over how best to describe these governments, and the vague, sporadic quality of the evidence allows for wide disagreements. Some emphasize the central role of the assemblies and thus tout them as democracies; other scholars focus on the upper-class domination of the leadership and possible control of the assembly and see an oligarchy or an aristocracy. Despite the assembly's obvious power, it has not yet been established whether the composition and participation were truly popular. This is reflected in the Arthashastra, an ancient handbook for monarchs on how to rule efficiently. It contains a chapter on how to deal with the s, which includes injunctions on manipulating the noble leaders, yet it does not mention how to influence the mass of the citizens, indicating that the "" are more of an aristocratic rule, or oligarchic republic, than "democracy".

Icelandic Commonwealth 
The Icelandic Commonwealth was established in 930 CE by refugees from Norway who had fled the unification of that country under King Harald Fairhair. The Commonwealth consisted of a number of clans run by chieftains, and the Althing was a combination of parliament and supreme court where disputes appealed from lower courts were settled, laws were decided, and decisions of national importance were taken. One such example was the Christianisation of Iceland in 1000, where the Althing decreed that all Icelanders must be baptized into Christianity, and forbade celebration of pagan rituals. Contrary to most states, the Icelandic Commonwealth had no official leader.

In the early 13th century, the Age of the Sturlungs, the Commonwealth began to suffer from long conflicts between warring clans. This, combined with pressure from the Norwegian king Haakon IV for the Icelanders to rejoin the Norwegian "family", led the Icelandic chieftains to accept Haakon IV as king by the signing of the Gamli sáttmáli ("Old Covenant") in 1262. This effectively brought the Commonwealth to an end. The Althing, however, is still Iceland's parliament, almost 800 years later.

Mercantile republics 

In Europe new republics appeared in the late Middle Ages when a number of small states embraced republican systems of government. These were generally small, but wealthy, trading states, like the Mediterranean maritime republics and the Hanseatic League, in which the merchant class had risen to prominence. Knud Haakonssen has noted that, by the Renaissance, Europe was divided with those states controlled by a landed elite being monarchies and those controlled by a commercial elite being republics.

Italy was the most densely populated area of Europe, and also one with the weakest central government. Many of the towns thus gained considerable independence and adopted commune forms of government. Completely free of feudal control, the Italian city-states expanded, gaining control of the rural hinterland. The two most powerful were the Republic of Venice and its rival the Republic of Genoa. Each were large trading ports, and further expanded by using naval power to control large parts of the Mediterranean. It was in Italy that an ideology advocating for republics first developed. Writers such as Bartholomew of Lucca, Brunetto Latini, Marsilius of Padua, and Leonardo Bruni saw the medieval city-states as heirs to the legacy of Greece and Rome.

Across Europe a wealthy merchant class developed in the important trading cities. Despite their wealth they had little power in the feudal system dominated by the rural land owners, and across Europe began to advocate for their own privileges and powers. The more centralized states, such as France and England, granted limited city charters.

In the more loosely governed Holy Roman Empire, 51 of the largest towns became free imperial cities. While still under the dominion of the Holy Roman Emperor most power was held locally and many adopted republican forms of government. The same rights to imperial immediacy were secured by the major trading cities of Switzerland. The towns and villages of alpine Switzerland had, courtesy of geography, also been largely excluded from central control. Unlike Italy and Germany, much of the rural area was thus not controlled by feudal barons, but by independent farmers who also used communal forms of government. When the Habsburgs tried to reassert control over the region both rural farmers and town merchants joined the rebellion. The Swiss were victorious, and the Swiss Confederacy was proclaimed, and Switzerland has retained a republican form of government to the present.

Two Russian cities with a powerful merchant class—Novgorod and Pskov—also adopted republican forms of government in 12th and 13th centuries, respectively, which ended when the republics were conquered by Muscovy/Russia at the end of 15th – beginning of 16th century.

The dominant form of government for these early republics was control by a limited council of elite patricians. In those areas that held elections, property qualifications or guild membership limited both who could vote and who could run. In many states no direct elections were held and council members were hereditary or appointed by the existing council. This left the great majority of the population without political power, and riots and revolts by the lower classes were common. The late Middle Ages saw more than 200 such risings in the towns of the Holy Roman Empire. Similar revolts occurred in Italy, notably the Ciompi Revolt in Florence.

Mercantile republics outside Europe 
Following the collapse of the Seljuk Sultanate of Rum and establishment of the Turkish Anatolian Beyliks, the Ahiler merchant fraternities established a state centered on Ankara that is sometimes compared to the Italian mercantile republics.

Calvinist republics 

While the classical writers had been the primary ideological source for the republics of Italy, in Northern Europe, the Protestant Reformation would be used as justification for establishing new republics. Most important was Calvinist theology, which developed in the Swiss Confederacy, one of the largest and most powerful of the medieval republics. John Calvin did not call for the abolition of monarchy, but he advanced the doctrine that the faithful had the duty to overthrow irreligious monarchs. Advocacy for republics appeared in the writings of the Huguenots during the French Wars of Religion.

Calvinism played an important role in the republican revolts in England and the Netherlands. Like the city-states of Italy and the Hanseatic League, both were important trading centres, with a large merchant class prospering from the trade with the New World. Large parts of the population of both areas also embraced Calvinism. During the Dutch Revolt (beginning in 1566), the Dutch Republic emerged from rejection of Spanish Habsburg rule. However, the country did not adopt the republican form of government immediately: in the formal declaration of independence (Act of Abjuration, 1581), the throne of king Philip was only declared vacant, and the Dutch magistrates asked the Duke of Anjou, queen Elizabeth of England and prince William of Orange, one after another, to replace Philip. It took until 1588 before the Estates (the Staten, the representative assembly at the time) decided to vest the sovereignty of the country in themselves.

In 1641 the English Civil War began. Spearheaded by the Puritans and funded by the merchants of London, the revolt was a success, and King Charles I was executed. In England James Harrington, Algernon Sidney, and John Milton became some of the first writers to argue for rejecting monarchy and embracing a republican form of government. The English Commonwealth was short-lived, and the monarchy was soon restored. The Dutch Republic continued in name until 1795, but by the mid-18th century the stadtholder had become a de facto monarch. Calvinists were also some of the earliest settlers of the British and Dutch colonies of North America.

Liberal republics 

Along with these initial republican revolts, early modern Europe also saw a great increase in monarchical power. The era of absolute monarchy replaced the limited and decentralized monarchies that had existed in most of the Middle Ages. It also saw a reaction against the total control of the monarch as a series of writers created the ideology known as liberalism.

Most of these Enlightenment thinkers were far more interested in ideas of constitutional monarchy than in republics. The Cromwell regime had discredited republicanism, and most thinkers felt that republics ended in either anarchy or tyranny. Thus philosophers like Voltaire opposed absolutism while at the same time being strongly pro-monarchy.

Jean-Jacques Rousseau and Montesquieu praised republics, and looked on the city-states of Greece as a model. However, both also felt that a state like France, with 20 million people, would be impossible to govern as a republic. Rousseau admired the republican experiment in Corsica (1755–1769) and described his ideal political structure of small, self-governing communes. Montesquieu felt that a city-state should ideally be a republic, but maintained that a limited monarchy was better suited to a state with a larger territory.

The American Revolution began as a rejection only of the authority of the British Parliament over the colonies, not of the monarchy. The failure of the British monarch to protect the colonies from what they considered the infringement of their rights to representative government, the monarch's branding of those requesting redress as traitors, and his support for sending combat troops to demonstrate authority resulted in widespread perception of the British monarchy as tyrannical.

With the United States Declaration of Independence the leaders of the revolt firmly rejected the monarchy and embraced republicanism. The leaders of the revolution were well versed in the writings of the French liberal thinkers, and also in history of the classical republics. John Adams had notably written a book on republics throughout history. In addition, the widely distributed and popularly read-aloud tract Common Sense, by Thomas Paine,  succinctly and eloquently laid out the case for republican ideals and independence to the larger public. The Constitution of the United States, went into effect in 1789, created a relatively strong federal republic to replace the relatively weak confederation under the first attempt at a national government with the Articles of Confederation and Perpetual Union ratified in 1781. The first ten amendments to the Constitution, called the United States Bill of Rights, guaranteed certain natural rights fundamental to republican ideals that justified the Revolution.

The French Revolution was also not republican at its outset. Only after the Flight to Varennes removed most of the remaining sympathy for the king was a republic declared and Louis XVI sent to the guillotine. The stunning success of France in the French Revolutionary Wars saw republics spread by force of arms across much of Europe as a series of client republics were set up across the continent. The rise of Napoleon saw the end of the French First Republic and her Sister Republics, each replaced by "popular monarchies". Throughout the Napoleonic period, the victors extinguished many of the oldest republics on the continent, including the Republic of Venice, the Republic of Genoa, and the Dutch Republic. They were eventually transformed into monarchies or absorbed into neighboring monarchies.

Outside Europe another group of republics was created as the Napoleonic Wars allowed the states of Latin America to gain their independence. Liberal ideology had only a limited impact on these new republics. The main impetus was the local European descended Creole population in conflict with the Peninsulares—governors sent from overseas. The majority of the population in most of Latin America was of either African or Amerindian descent, and the Creole elite had little interest in giving these groups power and broad-based popular sovereignty. Simón Bolívar, both the main instigator of the revolts and one of its most important theorists, was sympathetic to liberal ideals but felt that Latin America lacked the social cohesion for such a system to function and advocated autocracy as necessary.

In Mexico this autocracy briefly took the form of a monarchy in the First Mexican Empire. Due to the Peninsular War, the Portuguese court was relocated to Brazil in 1808. Brazil gained independence as a monarchy on September 7, 1822, and the Empire of Brazil lasted until 1889. In many other Latin American states various forms of autocratic republic existed until most were liberalized at the end of the 20th century.

The French Second Republic was created in 1848, but abolished by Napoleon III who proclaimed himself Emperor in 1852. The French Third Republic was established in 1870, when a civil revolutionary committee refused to accept Napoleon III's surrender during the Franco-Prussian War. Spain briefly became the First Spanish Republic in 1873–74, but the monarchy was soon restored. By the start of the 20th century France, Switzerland and San Marino remained the only republics in Europe. This changed when, after the 1908 Lisbon Regicide, the 5 October 1910 revolution established the Portuguese Republic.

In East Asia, China had seen considerable anti-Qing sentiment during the 19th century, and a number of protest movements developed calling for constitutional monarchy. The most important leader of these efforts was Sun Yat-sen, whose Three Principles of the People combined American, European, and Chinese ideas. Under his leadership the Republic of China was proclaimed on January 1, 1912.

Republicanism expanded significantly in the aftermath of World War I, when several of the largest European empires collapsed: the Russian Empire (1917), German Empire (1918), Austro-Hungarian Empire (1918), and Ottoman Empire (1922) were all replaced by republics. New states gained independence during this turmoil, and many of these, such as Ireland, Poland, Finland and Czechoslovakia, chose republican forms of government. Following Greece's defeat in the Greco-Turkish War (1919–22), the monarchy was briefly replaced by the Second Hellenic Republic (1924–35). In 1931, the proclamation of the Second Spanish Republic (1931–39) resulted in the Spanish Civil War that would be the prelude of World War II.

Republican ideas were spreading, especially in Asia. The United States began to have considerable influence in East Asia in the later part of the 19th century, with Protestant missionaries playing a central role. The liberal and republican writers of the west also exerted influence. These combined with native Confucian inspired political philosophy that had long argued that the populace had the right to reject unjust governments that had lost the Mandate of Heaven.

Two short-lived republics were proclaimed in East Asia, the Republic of Formosa and the First Philippine Republic.

Decolonization 

In the years following World War II, most of the remaining European colonies gained their independence, and most became republics. The two largest colonial powers were France and the United Kingdom. Republican France encouraged the establishment of republics in its former colonies. The United Kingdom attempted to follow the model it had for its earlier settler colonies of creating independent Commonwealth realms still linked under the same monarch. While most of the settler colonies and the smaller states of the Caribbean retained this system, it was rejected by the newly independent countries in Africa and Asia, which revised their constitutions and became republics instead.

Britain followed a different model in the Middle East; it installed local monarchies in several colonies and mandates including Iraq, Jordan, Kuwait, Bahrain, Oman, Yemen and Libya. In subsequent decades revolutions and coups overthrew a number of monarchs and installed republics. Several monarchies remain, and the Middle East is the only part of the world where several large states are ruled by monarchs with almost complete political control.

Socialist republics 

In the wake of the First World War, the Russian monarchy fell during the Russian Revolution. The Russian Provisional Government was established in its place on the lines of a liberal republic, but this was overthrown by the Bolsheviks who went on to establish the Union of Soviet Socialist Republics. This was the first republic established under Marxist–Leninist ideology. Communism was wholly opposed to monarchy, and became an important element of many republican movements during the 20th century. The Russian Revolution spread into Mongolia, and overthrew its theocratic monarchy in 1924. In the aftermath of the Second World War the communists gradually gained control of Romania, Bulgaria, Yugoslavia, Hungary and Albania, ensuring that the states were reestablished as socialist republics rather than monarchies.

Communism also intermingled with other ideologies. It was embraced by many national liberation movements during decolonization. In Vietnam, communist republicans pushed aside the Nguyễn dynasty, and monarchies in neighbouring Laos and Cambodia were overthrown by communist movements in the 1970s. Arab socialism contributed to a series of revolts and coups that saw the monarchies of Egypt, Iraq, Libya, and Yemen ousted. In Africa Marxist–Leninism and African socialism led to the end of monarchy and the proclamation of republics in states such as Burundi and Ethiopia.

Islamic republics 

Islamic political philosophy has a long history of opposition to absolute monarchy, notably in the work of Al-Farabi. Sharia law took precedence over the will of the ruler, and electing rulers by means of the Shura was an important doctrine. While the early caliphate maintained the principles of an elected ruler, later states became hereditary or military dictatorships though many maintained some pretense of a consultative shura.

None of these states are typically referred to as republics. The current usage of republic in Muslim countries is borrowed from the western meaning, adopted into the language in the late 19th century. The 20th century saw republicanism become an important idea in much of the Middle East, as monarchies were removed in many states of the region. Iraq became a secular state. Some nations, such as Indonesia and Azerbaijan, began as secular. In Iran, the 1979 revolution overthrew the monarchy and created an Islamic republic based on the ideas of Islamic democracy.

Head of state

Structure 

With no monarch, most modern republics use the title president for the head of state. Originally used to refer to the presiding officer of a committee or governing body in Great Britain the usage was also applied to political leaders, including the leaders of some of the Thirteen Colonies (originally Virginia in 1608); in full, the "President of the Council". The first republic to adopt the title was the United States of America. Keeping its usage as the head of a committee the President of the Continental Congress was the leader of the original congress. When the new constitution was written the title of President of the United States was conferred on the head of the new executive branch.

If the head of state of a republic is also the head of government, this is called a presidential system. There are a number of forms of presidential government. A full-presidential system has a president with substantial authority and a central political role.

In other states the legislature is dominant and the presidential role is almost purely ceremonial and apolitical, such as in Germany, Italy, India, and Trinidad and Tobago. These states are parliamentary republics and operate similarly to constitutional monarchies with parliamentary systems where the power of the monarch is also greatly circumscribed. In parliamentary systems the head of government, most often titled prime minister, exercises the most real political power. Semi-presidential systems have a president as an active head of state with important powers, but they also have a prime minister as a head of government with important powers.

The rules for appointing the president and the leader of the government, in some republics permit the appointment of a president and a prime minister who have opposing political convictions: in France, when the members of the ruling cabinet and the president come from opposing political factions, this situation is called cohabitation.

In some countries, like Bosnia and Herzegovina, San Marino, and Switzerland, the head of state is not a single person but a committee (council) of several persons holding that office. The Roman Republic had two consuls, elected for a one-year term by the comitia centuriata, consisting of all adult, freeborn males who could prove citizenship.

Elections 
In liberal democracies, presidents are elected, either directly by the people or indirectly by a parliament or council. Typically in presidential and semi-presidential systems the president is directly elected by the people, or is indirectly elected as done in the United States. In that country the president is officially elected by an electoral college, chosen by the States, all of which do so by direct election of the electors. The indirect election of the president through the electoral college conforms to the concept of republic as one with a system of indirect election. In the opinion of some, direct election confers legitimacy upon the president and gives the office much of its political power. However, this concept of legitimacy differs from that expressed in the United States Constitution which established the legitimacy of the United States president as resulting from the signing of the Constitution by nine states. The idea that direct election is required for legitimacy also contradicts the spirit of the Great Compromise, whose actual result was manifest in the clause that provides voters in smaller states with more representation in presidential selection than those in large states; for example citizens of Wyoming in 2016 had 3.6 times as much electoral vote representation as citizens of California.

In states with a parliamentary system the president is usually elected by the parliament. This indirect election subordinates the president to the parliament, and also gives the president limited legitimacy and turns most presidential powers into reserve powers that can only be exercised under rare circumstance. There are exceptions where elected presidents have only ceremonial powers, such as in Ireland.

Ambiguities 
The distinction between a republic and a monarchy is not always clear. The constitutional monarchies of the former British Empire and Western Europe today have almost all real political power vested in the elected representatives, with the monarchs only holding either theoretical powers, no powers or rarely used reserve powers. Real legitimacy for political decisions comes from the elected representatives and is derived from the will of the people. While hereditary monarchies remain in place, political power is derived from the people as in a republic. These states are thus sometimes referred to as crowned republics.

Terms such as "liberal republic" are also used to describe all of the modern liberal democracies.

There are also self-proclaimed republics that act similarly to absolute monarchies with absolute power vested in the leader and passed down from father to son. North Korea and Syria are two notable examples where a son has inherited political control. Neither of these states are officially monarchies. There is no constitutional requirement that power be passed down within one family, but it has occurred in practice.

There are also elective monarchies where ultimate power is vested in a monarch, but the monarch is chosen by some manner of election. A current example of such a state is Malaysia where the Yang di-Pertuan Agong is elected every five years by the Conference of Rulers composed of the nine hereditary rulers of the Malay states, and the Vatican City-State, where the pope is selected by cardinal-electors, currently all cardinals under the age of 80. While rare today, elective monarchs were common in the past. The Holy Roman Empire is an important example, where each new emperor was chosen by a group of electors. Islamic states also rarely employed primogeniture, instead relying on various forms of election to choose a monarch's successor.

The Polish–Lithuanian Commonwealth had an elective monarchy, with a wide suffrage of some 500,000 nobles. The system, known as the Golden Liberty, had developed as a method for powerful landowners to control the crown. The proponents of this system looked to classical examples, and the writings of the Italian Renaissance, and called their elective monarchy a rzeczpospolita, based on res publica.

Sub-national republics 

In general being a republic also implies sovereignty as for the state to be ruled by the people it cannot be controlled by a foreign power. There are important exceptions to this, for example, republics in the Soviet Union were member states which had to meet three criteria to be named republics:

 be on the periphery of the Soviet Union so as to be able to take advantage of their theoretical right to secede;
 be economically strong enough to be self-sufficient upon secession; and
 be named after at least one million people of the ethnic group which should make up the majority population of said republic.

It is sometimes argued that the former Soviet Union was also a supra-national republic, based on the claim that the member states were different nation states.

The Socialist Federal Republic of Yugoslavia was a federal entity composed of six republics (Socialist Republic of Bosnia and Herzegovina, Croatia, Macedonia, Montenegro, Serbia, and Slovenia). Each republic had its parliament, government, institute of citizenship, constitution, etc., but certain functions were delegated to the federation (army, monetary matters). Each republic also had a right of self-determination according to the conclusions of the second session of the AVNOJ and according to the federal constitution.

In Switzerland, all cantons can be considered to have a republican form of government, with constitutions, legislatures, executives and courts; many of them being originally sovereign states. As a consequence, several Romance-speaking cantons are still officially referred to as republics, reflecting their history and will of independence within the Swiss Confederation. Notable examples are the Republic and Canton of Geneva and the Republic and Canton of Ticino.

States of the United States are required, like the federal government, to be republican in form, with final authority resting with the people. This was required because the states were intended to create and enforce most domestic laws, with the exception of areas delegated to the federal government and prohibited to the states. The founders of the country intended most domestic laws to be handled by the states. Requiring the states to be a republic in form was seen as protecting the citizens' rights and preventing a state from becoming a dictatorship or monarchy, and reflected unwillingness on the part of the original 13 states (all independent republics) to unite with other states that were not republics. Additionally, this requirement ensured that only other republics could join the union.

In the example of the United States, the original 13 British colonies became independent states after the American Revolution, each having a republican form of government. These independent states initially formed a loose confederation called the United States and then later formed the current United States by ratifying the current U.S. Constitution, creating a union that was a republic. Any state joining the union later was also required to be a republic.

Other meanings

Archaic meaning
Before the 17th Century, the term 'republic' could be used to refer to states of any form of government as long as it was not a tyrannical regime. French philosopher Jean Bodin's definition of the republic was “the rightly ordered government of a number of families, and of those things which are their common concern, by a sovereign power.” Oligarchies and monarchies could also be included as they were also organised toward 'public' shared interests. In medieval texts, 'republic' was used to refer to the body of shared interest with the king at its head. For instance, the Holy Roman Empire was also known as the Sancta Respublica Romana, the Holy Roman Republic. The Byzantine Empire also continued calling itself the Roman Republic as the Byzantines did not regard monarchy as a contradiction to republicanism. Instead, republics were defined as any state based on popular sovereignty and whose institutions were based on shared values.

Democracy vs. Republic debate 
While the term democracy has been used interchangeably with the term republic by some, others have made sharp distinctions between the two for millennia. "Montesquieu, founder of the modern constitutional state, repeated in his The Spirit of the Laws of 1748 the insight that Aristotle had expressed two millennia earlier, ‘Voting by lot is in the nature of democracy; voting by choice is in the nature of aristocracy.’" Additional critics of elections include Rousseau, Robespierre, and Marat, who said of the new French Republic, "‘What use is it to us, that we have broken the aristocracy of the nobles, if that is replaced by the aristocracy of the rich?’"

Political philosophy 

The term republic originated from the writers of the Renaissance as a descriptive term for states that were not monarchies. These writers, such as Machiavelli, also wrote important prescriptive works describing how such governments should function. These ideas of how a government and society should be structured is the basis for an ideology known as classical republicanism or civic humanism. This ideology is based on the Roman Republic and the city states of Ancient Greece and focuses on ideals such as civic virtue, rule of law and mixed government.

This understanding of a republic as a form of government distinct from a liberal democracy is one of the main theses of the Cambridge School of historical analysis. This grew out of the work of J. G. A. Pocock who in 1975 argued that a series of scholars had expressed a consistent set of republican ideals. These writers included Machiavelli, Milton, Montesquieu and the founders of the United States of America.

Pocock argued that this was an ideology with a history and principles distinct from liberalism. These ideas were embraced by a number of different writers, including Quentin Skinner, Philip Pettit and Cass Sunstein. These subsequent writers have further explored the history of the idea, and also outlined how a modern republic should function.

United States 

A distinct set of definitions of the term "republic" evolved in the United States, where the term is often equated with "representative democracy." This narrower understanding of the term was originally developed by James Madison and notably employed in Federalist Paper No. 10. This meaning was widely adopted early in the history of the United States, including in Noah Webster's dictionary of 1828. It was a novel meaning to the term; representative democracy was not an idea mentioned by Machiavelli and did not exist in the classical republics. There is also evidence that contemporaries of Madison considered the meaning of "republic" to reflect the broader definition found elsewhere, as is the case with a quotation of Benjamin Franklin taken from the notes of James McHenry where the question is put forth, "a Republic or a Monarchy?".

The term republic does not appear in the Declaration of Independence, but it does appear in Article IV of the Constitution, which "guarantee[s] to every State in this Union a Republican form of Government." What exactly the writers of the constitution felt this should mean is uncertain. The Supreme Court, in Luther v. Borden (1849), declared that the definition of republic was a "political question" in which it would not intervene. In two later cases, it did establish a basic definition. In United States v. Cruikshank (1875), the court ruled that the "equal rights of citizens" were inherent to the idea of a republic.

However, the term republic is not synonymous with the republican form. The republican form is defined as one in which the powers of sovereignty are vested in the people and are exercised by the people, either directly, or through representatives chosen by the people, to whom those powers are specially delegated.

Beyond these basic definitions, the word republic has a number of other connotations. W. Paul Adams observes that republic is most often used in the United States as a synonym for "state" or "government," but with more positive connotations than either of those terms.  Republicanism is often referred to as the founding ideology of the United States. Traditionally scholars believed this American republicanism was a derivation of the classical liberal ideologies of John Locke and others developed in Europe.

A political philosophy of republicanism that formed during the Renaissance period and initiated by Machiavelli was thought to have had little impact on the founders of the United States. In the 1960s and 1970s, a revisionist school led by the likes of Bernard Bailyn began to argue that republicanism was just as or even more important than liberalism in the creation of the United States. This issue is still much disputed and scholars like Isaac Kramnick completely reject this view.

See also 
 Commonwealth
 Democracy
 Democratic republic
 Free state
 Primus inter pares
 List of republics
 Index: Republics
 Republicanism
 Republics of Russia
 Guarantee Clause of the U.S. Constitution

References

Further reading

 Martin van Gelderen & Quentin Skinner, eds., Republicanism: A Shared European Heritage, v. 1, Republicanism and Constitutionalism in Early Modern Europe, Cambridge: Cambridge University Press., 2002
 Martin van Gelderen & Quentin Skinner, eds., Republicanism: A Shared European Heritage, v. 2, The Values of Republicanism in Early Modern Europe, Cambridge: Cambridge U.P., 2002
 Willi Paul Adams, "Republicanism in Political Rhetoric before 1776", Political Science Quarterly 85(1970), pp. 397–421.
 Joyce Appleby, "Republicanism in Old and New Contexts", in William & Mary Quarterly, 3rd series, 43 (January, 1986), pp. 3–34.
 Joyce Appleby, ed., "Republicanism" issue of American Quarterly 37 (Fall, 1985).
 Sarah Barber, Regicide and Republicanism: Politics and Ethics in the English Republic, 1646–1649, Edinburgh: Edinburgh University Press, 1998. 
 Gisela Bock, Quentin Skinner & Maurizio Viroli, eds., Machiavelli and Republicanism, Cambridge: Cambridge U.P., 1990.
 
 Eric Gojosso, Le concept de république en France (XVIe – XVIIIe siècle), Aix/Marseille, 1998, pp. 205–45.
 James Hankins, "Exclusivist Republicanism and the Non-Monarchical Republic", Political Theory 38.4 (August 2010), 452–82.
 Frédéric Monera, L'idée de République et la jurisprudence du Conseil constitutionnel – Paris: L.G.D.J., 2004 Fnac, LGDJ.fr
 Philip Pettit, Republicanism: A Theory of Freedom and Government, Oxford: Clarendon Press, 1997, pp. x and 304.
 J. G. A. Pocock, The Machiavellian Moment: Florentine Political Thought and the Atlantic Republican Tradition, Princeton: Princeton University Press, 1975 
 J. G. A. Pocock, "Between Gog and Magog: The Republican Thesis and the Ideologia Americana", Journal of the History of Ideas 48 (1987), p. 341
 J. G. A. Pocock, "The Machiavellian Moment Revisited: A Study in History and Ideology" Journal of Modern History 53 (1981) 
 Paul A. Rahe, Republics Ancient and Modern: Classical Republicanism and the American Revolution, 3 v., Chapel Hill: U. of North Carolina Press 1992, 1994.
 Jagdish P. Sharma, Republics in ancient India, c. 1500 B.C.–500 B.C., 1968
 David Wootton, ed., Republicanism, Liberty, and Commercial Society, 1649–1776 (The Making of Modern Freedom series), Stanford, CA: Stanford University Press, 1994.
• Thomas Corwin, Senate Speech Against the Mexican War-Congressional Globe 1847.

External links 
William R. Everdell, "From State to Freestate: The Meaning of the Word Republic from Jean Bodin to John Adams"  (7th ISECS, Budapest, 7/31/87) in Valley Forge Journal, June, 1991